Cibyra umbrifera is a species of moth of the family Hepialidae. It is known from Brazil.

References

External links
Hepialidae genera

Moths described in 1874
Hepialidae